Home and Dry may refer to:

 "Home and Dry" (Pet Shop Boys song), 2002
 "Home and Dry" (Gerry Rafferty song), a 1978 hit song recorded by British singer Gerry Rafferty on his City to City LP